Beyond the Poseidon Adventure is a 1979 American action-adventure disaster film and a sequel to The Poseidon Adventure (1972) directed by Irwin Allen and starring Michael Caine and Sally Field. It was a critical and commercial failure, and was the only Allen disaster film to receive no Academy Award nominations. Its box office receipts were only 20% of its estimated $10 million budget.

Plot 
The film picks up directly after the events of the previous film. The capsized luxury liner S.S. Poseidon is still afloat after six survivors have been rescued by the French Coast Guard.

Tugboat captain Mike Turner spots the rescue helicopter and subsequently finds the shipwreck. Accompanied by second mate Wilbur and passenger Celeste Whitman, he heads out to claim salvage rights, as the tugboat Jenny lost her cargo in the same tsunami that capsized the Poseidon.

They are soon followed by Dr. Stefan Svevo and his crew, who claim to be Greek Orthodox medics who received the ship's SOS. They board the doomed vessel through the bottom hull opening left by the French rescue team, then become trapped after the entrance collapses. The group with Turner encounters the ship's nurse, Gina Rowe and two passengers, elegantly dressed Suzanne Constantine and war veteran Frank Mazzetti, who is searching for his missing daughter Theresa. Theresa is found, as are elevator operator Larry Simpson and a "billionaire" called "Tex" who clings to a valuable bottle of wine. Later they also find the blind Harold Meredith and his wife Hannah, who were waiting to be rescued.

Water continues to submerge decks and more explosions occur. Turner and his group find the purser's office, where Svevo decides he and his men will search for other survivors, parting ways with Turner's group. Another explosion causes the safe in the purser's office to fall through the bulkhead and open, revealing gold coins, diamonds and cash. Turner and Wilbur excitedly gather the coins.

Unknown to Turner and the survivors, Suzanne is actually working with Svevo. She takes a list containing information about a cargo of crates from the purser's office. Going off on her own, she gives Svevo the document but decides to rejoin Turner's group. Svevo orders Doyle, one of his men, to kill Suzanne. He shoots her, but before she dies she strikes Doyle with an axe, killing him. While making their way up through the decks, Turner and the others find Suzanne's corpse and reach the unpleasant conclusion that a murderer is on board.

Hannah dislocates her shoulder while helping her husband. Svevo and his men are found gathering a cargo of plutonium. Svevo reveals that his real intention for boarding the Poseidon was to retrieve his lost shipment of plutonium, adding that he can't let Turner and his group go now. However, before anyone is killed, another explosion occurs, allowing Turner's group to escape through another cargo room.

Turner, Mazzetti and Simpson find guns and attempt to make a fight of it. In the ensuing shoot-out, Mazzetti and Castrop, another of Svevo's men, are killed. Water floods the deck as Turner's group proceeds up to the next deck, where an injured Hannah is unable to climb a ladder: she falls into the rising water and drowns. While trying to rescue her, Turner loses all of his salvaged gold. Svevo and his one remaining gunman head back up to the ship's stern, where the rest of Svevo's team attempt to use a crane to raise the plutonium up to the hull, which is still above water but is slowly sinking.

In another section of the ship, Turner and the survivors exit the ship through an underwater side door, but due to shortage of scuba tanks, Wilbur (unknown to Turner and his group) sacrifices himself by swimming underwater and disappearing. Turner and Celeste swim to the tugboat Jenny and move it closer to the Poseidon as the remaining survivors swim towards it. Svevo's men see them and open fire. Tex, who in reality was not a wealthy passenger but a sommelier (part of the Poseidons crew), holds onto his wine bottle as he is gunned down and perishes. The rest of Turner's group makes it to his tugboat and they sail away. Water continues to flood the Poseidon, causing the boilers and then the plutonium cargo to erupt, exploding the ship's hull and sinking it stern first. As it sinks, Svevo and his men are killed.

On board Turner's boat, Turner accepts that his tugboat Jenny will be taken from him when they get to port, but Celeste reveals a diamond she salvaged from the Poseidon. Celeste asks Turner, "Are you going to kiss me now?" and Turner replies, "I was going to kiss you anyway". They do so and the tugboat Jenny sails away into the sunset with the six survivors.

Characters

Salvage team 
 Michael Caine as Captain Mike Turner
 Karl Malden as Wilbur Hubbard
 Sally Field as Celeste Whitman

Greek salvage team 
 Telly Savalas as Dr. Stefan Svevo
 Paul Picerni as Kurt
 Patrick Culliton as Doyle
 Dean Raphael Ferrandini as Castrop

Poseidon passengers 
 Peter Boyle as Frank Mazzetti
 Angela Cartwright as Theresa Mazzetti
 Jack Warden as Harold Meredith
 Shirley Knight as Hannah Meredith
 Veronica Hamel as Suzanne Constantine

Poseidon crew 
 Shirley Jones as Nurse Gina Rowe
 Slim Pickens as Dewey "Tex" Hopkins
 Mark Harmon as Elevator Operator Larry Simpson

Production 
In 1973, soon after the first film came out, producer Irwin Allen proposed a sequel that would have had the survivors testifying in a hearing on the disaster in Austria, the country of the Poseidons parent company. While on a train to the hearing, a miles-long mountain tunnel would collapse, leaving the survivors of the train trapped inside, struggling to make their way out. The film was planned to be released at Christmas 1974 from 20th Century Fox. Most of the main cast was initially intended to reprise their roles from the first film. This premise was eventually used in the Rob Cohen film Daylight (1996) with Sylvester Stallone.

Originally planned with the first film's distributor 20th Century Fox, the film ended up moving to Warner Bros. Pictures after they signed a three picture deal with Allen in 1975.

Relationship of Gallico's novels to the films 
Paul Gallico's novel The Poseidon Adventure had ended with the ship's sinking. The original film changed much of the novel's plot and ended with the ship still afloat. After the huge success of the film, Gallico was asked to write a novel that would be a sequel not to his first novel, but to the film. It would feature a new group of people entering the still capsized ship and could be made into a second film. In response, Gallico started writing Beyond the Poseidon Adventure, but he died on July 15, 1976 before completing the book. The book was published on January 1, 1978. Once again the film that followed ended up bearing little resemblance to his book. Instead of sinking, the ship explodes, along with Svevo and his men.

Filming 
Filming started in September 1978 at Burbank Studios with location shooting off the California coast and Catalina Island.

Reception 
On Rotten Tomatoes the film has an approval rating of 0% based on reviews from 8 critics, with an average rating of 3.50/10. On Metacritic the film has a weighted average score of 22 out of 100, based on 6 critics, indicating "generally unfavorable reviews".

Roger Ebert gave the film one star out of four.  Janet Maslin of The New York Times wrote that Irwin Allen "is so obviously ill-equipped to stage action scenes in cramped quarters that his audience winds up wishing as fervently as his characters for a chance to see the light of day". Variety wrote that the film "comes off as a virtual remake of the 1972 original, without that film's mounting suspense and excitement". Gene Siskel gave the film one star out of four and slammed it as "virtually the same story as the original disaster film", with "shoddily painted sets; tiny studio-created fires all of the same size; and dialog that could be written by a 1st-grader". Kevin Thomas of the Los Angeles Times called the film "an instance of too little too late. The sequel is painstakingly crafted and pleasant to watch but seems routine and even tedious at times, mainly because there has been so much razzle-dazzle on the screen since the S.S. Poseidon capsized—including, of course, Allen's own Towering Inferno". Clyde Jeavons of The Monthly Film Bulletin wrote that the film "is not so much a sequel as a remake, and a fairly dismal, cut-price one at that, its shoddiness being risibly exemplified from the start by the almost Python-esque studio-tank storm which assails Michael Caine's see-sawing salvage tug".

Home media 
A region one DVD version was released on August 22, 2006. A digital version is available for rental and purchase on the PlayStation Network for the PlayStation 3, and it is also up for purchase and rental on the iTunes Store. Warner Home Video re-released the DVD via their Warner Archive Collection on June 23, 2014.

See also 
 List of films with a 0% rating on Rotten Tomatoes

References

External links 
 
 
 
 

1979 films
1970s action adventure films
1970s adventure thriller films
1970s disaster films
American action adventure films
American adventure thriller films
American disaster films
American sequel films
Films about survivors of seafaring accidents or incidents
Films about terrorism
Films based on works by Paul Gallico
Films based on thriller novels
Films based on adventure novels
Films based on American novels
Films directed by Irwin Allen
Films produced by Irwin Allen
Films scored by Jerry Fielding
Films set on ships
Warner Bros. films
Films set in the Mediterranean Sea
1970s English-language films
1970s American films